Partial general elections were held in Luxembourg on 13 and 20 June 1905, electing 21 out of 48 members of the Chamber of Deputies.

Results

References

Luxembourg
1905 in Luxembourg
Chamber of Deputies (Luxembourg) elections
June 1905 events